Lê Nhân Tông (黎仁宗, 28 May 1441 – 25 October 1459), birth name Lê Bang Cơ (黎邦基) was the third emperor of the Later Lê dynasty from 1453 until his murder in a coup in 1459. He was a grandson of the emperor Lê Lợi. During nearly all of his reign, the real power behind the throne was his mother, Empress Dowager Tuyên Từ, a royal consort of Lê Thái Tông.

Biography 
With the sudden death of Lê Thái Tông, his heir was an infant son named Bang Co, mothered by Royal Consort Nguyen Thi Anh. He was the third son of his father, but the elder son (Le Nghi Dân) had been officially passed over due to his mother's low social status.

The government was actually under the control of Trinh Kha. Trịnh Khả was a long-time aide, friend, and counselor of Lê Lợi. By 1442, he was the first among the surviving top aides of Lê Lợi, the others had been killed or were second rank. Despite the dangers of having an infant on the throne, the government seems to have run well with no serious problems. The mother of the emperor, Empress Dowager Tuyên Từ was around 21 years old when her son was appointed the future emperor, over time she assumed more power in the government.

The next 17 years were good years for Vietnam. While some disputes surfaced between the Confucian scholars and the noble families, by and large things were fairly peaceful and prosperous for the country.

The king of Champa, Maha Vijaya, raided Hoa-chau in 1444 and 1445. The Court of Annam sent messages to the Zhengtong Emperor of Ming China protesting these raids. The Ming did nothing other than rebuke Champa, so in 1446 the Vietnamese sent an army under the command of Le Kha and Le Tho to enter Cham territory. The campaign was successful, with the capture of the Cham capital Vijaya.  "Maha Vijaya was made prisoner with his wives and concubines, elephants, horses, and weapons."

The Vietnamese were driven out a year later. However, the Cham did not mount another offensive against the Vietnamese for the next twenty years.

In 1451, for reasons that are unclear, Anh ordered the execution of Trịnh Khả and his eldest son. Two years later, Trịnh Khả was officially pardoned along with several other close advisors to Le Loi who had been killed (like Lê Sát). The pardon occurred in conjunction with the official ascension to power of Lê Nhân Tông, though he was only 12 years old at the time.

It is unknown why a 12-year-old boy was formally given the power of government since ancient Vietnamese custom stated that power could only be given at the age of 16. It may have been done to remove the Empress Nguyen Thi Anh from power, but if that was the reason, it failed, the young emperor's mother still controlled the government up until the 1459 coup.

In 1459, Lê Nhân Tông's older brother, Lê Nghi Dân, plotted with a group of officials to kill the emperor. On October 28, the plotters with some 100 "shiftless men" entered into the palace and killed the emperor (he was just 18). The next day, facing certain execution, his mother, Empress Dowager Tuyên Từ, was killed by a loyal servant.

This ended the nearly 20-year period when Vietnam was essentially ruled by a woman. Later Vietnamese historians offered two different pictures of this time, one court historian said this was a period of benevolent rule, with harmony in the court and idyllic peace in the land. Another historian says the court was in chaos and that having a woman rule the state was as unnatural as "a hen crowing at daybreak". Good counselors like Trịnh Khả had been removed from office and inept men had been elevated, bringing oppression and calamity to Vietnam.

Lê Nghi Dân would not long enjoy his rule; he was removed from power and killed in a counter-coup just 9 months later. The next emperor of Vietnam was the last son of Lê Thái Tông: Lê Thánh Tông, perhaps the greatest emperor in Vietnamese history.

See also
 List of Vietnamese dynasties

References

This history is based on the doctoral thesis of John K. Whitmore "The Development of the Le Government in Fifteenth Century Vietnam" (Cornell University, 1968). The thesis is mostly concerned with the structure and make-up of the Le government from 1427 to 1471.

1441 births
1459 deaths
Nhan Tong
Murdered royalty
Child monarchs from Asia
15th-century Vietnamese monarchs
Vietnamese murder victims
Vietnamese monarchs